Cooperating Associations, also known as interpretive associations or natural history associations, support the interpretive, educational and scientific programs and services of governmental land management agencies such as the National Park Service, USDA Forest Service, US Fish and Wildlife Service, Bureau of Land Management, US Army Corps of Engineers, or state park departments.

Associations assist in the production of site-specific products, distribute educational and scientific publications produced by agencies, donate materials for use in interpretive programs and exhibits, and work to secure grants and funding. This is accomplished through bookstore sales, membership support, publication and product development, research funding, and other educational programs and activities. They must hold a federally tax-exempt, not-for-profit status under Section 501(c)(3) of the Internal Revenue Code.

Purpose 
Cooperating associations recognize the public as an important resource for the preservation of public land, and help citizens to better understand land management issues by providing information and services in visitor centers and other locations.  By doing so, cooperating associations contribute to the understanding of a variety of stewardship issues, cultivate an appreciation of public lands, and help reduce adverse impacts on natural and cultural resources.

History 
After the founding of the National Park Service in 1916 several non-profit organizations were
formed to support educational and interpretive programs and projects not covered by government funding, the first being the Yosemite Association which was formed in 1923. Several similar nonprofit organizations became known as cooperating associations by 1936, and were formally recognized by Congress in 1946 (Public Law 79-633).
no

Types of Cooperating Associations

Authorization and Affiliation

National Park Service 
Within the National Park Service, authority to designate or affiliate with a cooperating association is assigned to the regional directors and cannot be re-delegated. In the case of organizations serving multiple regions, which includes Eastern National and Western National Parks Association, the Director of the National Park Service signs the agreements. In the fiscal year 2008, 71 associations operated more than 100 outlets in 325 units of the National Park Service.

The USDA Forest Service 
Within the Forest Service, authority is assumed to lie with the regional foresters, but may be re-delegated to forest supervisors for single site agreements. The Forest Service currently works with 24 cooperating associations.

The Bureau of Land Management 
Within the Bureau of Land Management, authority to designate or affiliate with a cooperating association is assigned to the state director but can be re-delegated to district managers. As of 2010, the Bureau of Land Management works with 21 cooperating associations in all twelve western states.

US Fish and Wildlife Service 
Within the US Fish and Wildlife Service, authority is assumed to lie with the regional director but may be re-delegated to refuge managers for single site agreements. The United States Fish and Wildlife Service currently holds agreements with 8 cooperating associations.

US Army Corps of Engineers 
The US Army Corps of Engineers currently works with 3 cooperating agreements. Authority is held by the Commanding General and Chief of Engineers.

Other Cooperating Association Partners 
Municipal Agencies
National Scenic Byways
United States Bureau of Reclamation
State Parks
U.S Geological Survey
Other qualified not-for-profit organizations

Friends Groups 
Friends groups are non-profit organizations that partner with public lands agencies to accomplish activities that typically benefit a specific park or public lands area. While some friends groups also function as cooperating associations, the two terms are not interchangeable, as the authority to operate interpretive sales outlets on public lands is governed by specific agreements and authorities.

References

External links
 US Army Corps of Engineers
 National Park Service
 Bureau of Land Management
 USDA Forest Service
 US Fish & Wildlife
 

Non-profit organizations based in the United States
Types of business entity